Iba May (born 6 June 1998) is a German footballer who plays as a midfielder.

Career
May made his professional debut for Eintracht Braunschweig in the 2020–21 DFB-Pokal on 11 September 2020, coming on as a substitute in the 88th minute for Fabio Kaufmann in the home match against Hertha BSC, which finished as a 5–4 win.

References

External links
 
 
 Iba May at kicker.de
 
 

1998 births
Living people
Footballers from Berlin
German footballers
Association football midfielders
VfL Wolfsburg II players
Eintracht Braunschweig players
Regionalliga players
2. Bundesliga players
3. Liga players